The Codex Diplomaticus Aevi Saxonici is a collection of documents from the Anglo-Saxon period preserved in manuscripts held by various libraries in England.
Published in six volumes between 1839 and 1848, this was the first collected edition of the surviving corpus of Anglo-Saxon charters.

References

Chronicles, English
History of literature in England
Texts of Anglo-Saxon England
Anglo-Saxon literature
English chronicles
Anglo-Saxon law
Political charters
Medieval charters and cartularies of England